The Citizens National Bank Building, at 801 Grand Ave. in Glenwood Springs, Colorado, was built in 1913.  It was listed on the National Register of Historic Places in 1999.  It has also been known as the New Citizens Building.  Besides serving as a financial institution, it has served as a specialty store and as a hotel.

It was designed by Denver architect Guy B. Robertson.  It is a three-story building, prominent on the corner of Grand Ave. and 8th st. as almost all other Grand Ave. buildings are one or two stories tall.  It is a two-part commercial block building, with Classical Revival ornamentation, and also with elements of 20th Century Commercial Style including in its flat roof, projecting cornice, and Chicago-style windows on its upper floors.

References

Bank buildings on the National Register of Historic Places in Colorado
National Register of Historic Places in Garfield County, Colorado
Neoclassical architecture in Colorado
Buildings and structures completed in 1913